Stowers Ranch is a cattle ranch in Kerr County, Texas, in the Texas Hill Country. Founded by G.A. Stowers in 1904 as a cattle ranch, game management area, and hunting preserve, it is now owned and operated by Stowers' grandchildren and great-grandchildren. The outdoor recreation at the ranch includes hunting for whitetail deer, exotic bucks, and wild turkey, as well as birdwatching, game viewing, nature photography, and hiking. On its north side, it is adjacent to the Kerr Wildlife Management Area.

Wildlife
A deer-proof perimeter fence, in place for close to 100 years, and advanced pasture, cattle, and wildlife management practices have led to the development of a whitetail deer population and a broad diversity of plant and animal life. Axis, sika and fallow deer are also seen in strong numbers, as are blackbuck antelope and aoudad sheep. Bird watchers report seeing many varieties of sought-after birds, including the blackcap vireo, the golden-cheeked warbler, blue herons, and both bald and golden eagles. A sanctuary for the blackcap vireo is now established along one of the northern edges of the property.

Native life is not limited to the animal kingdom. Under good conditions, stands of perennial prairie grasses such as cane bluestem, little bluestem, big bluestem, sideoats grama, hairy gramma, curly mesquite, buffalograss, fall witchgrass, plains lovegrass, wildrye, Texas wintergrass, and Indiangrass blanket the rolling countryside. In the spring there is usually a profusion of wildflowers, including the famous Texas bluebonnet and cactus blossoms. Other wildflowers bloom throughout the year.

Stowers Ranch Airport
There is a grass airstrip on the northeastern edge of the property that was active through the 1970s but is now unused. Although it is now split by a fence shared with an adjacent ranch, the airstrip remains listed by the FAA and other sources.

Stowers Cave
Stowers Ranch also is the location of the Stowers Cave, the 19th longest cave in Texas, with a 2,697 meter traverse length and a survey depth of 39.6 meters. The cave is the home to a large bat population, and it features access to underground streams.

References

External links
 Stowers Ranch website

Buildings and structures in Kerr County, Texas
Tourist attractions in Kerr County, Texas
Ranches in Texas
1904 establishments in Texas
American companies established in 1904